Jobourg is a former commune in the Manche department in north-western France. On 1 January 2017, it was merged into the new commune La Hague. It lies near Cap de la Hague in the Cotentin peninsula. Its population was 493 in 2019.

It is surrounded by moorland and is not far away from the Phare de Goury (Goury Lighthouse), a lighthouse 100 metres away from the Goury beach.
Jobourg has one nice beach on its commune, the Baie d'Écalgrain ("Écalgrain Beach"). The average temperature of the sea is 20 °C in summer. About 200 meters from the village is the CROSSMA, in charge of the busy traffic in the Channel.

One typical fête in Jobourg is the Fête des Moutons, a sheep festival that take place the first weekend of August. The festival features contests in which border collies heard geese and sheep.

On the night of 26–27 March 1814, during the closing stages of the Napoleonic Wars the Battle of Jobourg was fought close inshore between British frigate HMS Hebrus and French frigate Etoile. After several hours of combat, Hebrus succeeded in defeating and capturing  Etoile.

Geology 
Jobourg lies in the Armorican Massif. There, France's oldest rocks crop out.

See also
Communes of the Manche department

References

External links
Baie d'Écalgrain
tout sur la Baie d'Écalgrain

Former communes of Manche
Geology of France